Jamiat ul-Ulama meaning Council of Theologians in Arabic could refer to:

 Jamiatul Ulama Transvaal, a Muslim organization that operates in the Transvaal region of South Africa.
 Jamiatul Ulama KwaZulu-Natal, a Muslim organization that operates in KwaZulu-Natal Province, South Africa. Founded in Durban by senior Muslim Theologian
 Jamiat Ulema-i-Islam, a Pakistani political party
 Jamiat Ulema-e-Pakistan, a Pakistani political party